Kylie Bunbury (born January 30, 1989) is a Canadian-American actress.

Life
Bunbury was born in Montreal, Canada, to Kristi Novak and Alex Bunbury, a soccer player. Her father is Guyanese-Canadian. She spent her childhood in England (for two years), Madeira, Portugal (for seven years) and Prior Lake, Minnesota, US. She considers Prior Lake home. She has three younger brothers: Teal, Mataeo, and Logan.

Bunbury became engaged to Jon-Ryan Alan Riggins on April 8, 2018. They married on January 1, 2020. Her pregnancy was announced in June 2021, and their son was born on December 6, 2021.

Career 
Bunbury originally worked as a model, and began acting at her agency's suggestion. She landed her first role as Kathleen in Days of Our Lives for one episode. She also had roles in Prom and The Sitter. Bunbury portrayed Eva in the science fiction CBS television series Under the Dome. Bunbury starred in the Fox drama series Pitch, where she portrayed the (fictional) first female player in Major League Baseball. Pitch was canceled by Fox after one season on May 1, 2017.

Bunbury starred as Angie Richardson in the Netflix miniseries When They See Us, which premiered on May 31, 2019.

In 2020, Bunbury was in the main cast for the Peacock adaptation of Aldous Huxley’s Brave New World. The series was cancelled after one season. That same year, she began playing Cassie Dewell in the ABC crime drama series Big Sky.

Filmography

Film

Television

References

External links
 
 

1989 births
Actresses from Hamilton, Ontario
American film actresses
Canadian people of Guyanese descent
American television actresses
Living people
People from Prior Lake, Minnesota
Actresses from Minnesota
American people of Guyanese descent
Canadian film actresses
Canadian television actresses
21st-century Canadian actresses
21st-century American actresses
Canadian emigrants to the United States
Black Canadian actresses
African-American actresses